Journey Forward is a 501(c)3 non-profit organization outside of Boston, Massachusetts in the city of Canton, Massachusetts dedicated to improving the lives of those who have suffered paralysis through a spinal cord injury with exercise programs.

Journey Forward was founded by Dan Cummings, a C6 quadriplegic who regained the ability to walk, in June 2008.

Mission
Journey Forward is dedicated to improving the lives of those who have suffered a spinal cord injury through an intense exercise program.

References

External links
Journey Forward Official Site

Charities based in Massachusetts
Disability organizations based in the United States